NGC 1347 is a barred spiral galaxy situated in the constellation of Eridanus. It is at a distance of 81 million light years and is a member of the Eridanus cluster, a cluster of about 200 galaxies.

NGC 1347 has a Hubble classification of SBc, which indicates it is a barred spiral galaxy. It is moving away from the Milky Way at a rate of 1,760 km/s. Its size on the night sky is 1.5' x 1.3' which is proportional to its real size of 35 000 ly.

NGC 1347 forms a pair, named Arp 39, with the galaxy PGC 816443.

References 

Eridanus (constellation)
Barred spiral galaxies
1347
039
012989